Matteo Spagnolo (born 10 January 2003) is an Italian professional basketball player for Dolomiti Energia Trento of the Lega Basket Serie A (LBA) on loan from Real Madrid Baloncesto.

Early life and career
Spagnolo started playing basketball at the age of four and began his youth career with Aurora Brindisi. At age 12, he scored 78 points and 77 points in the semifinal and final of the regional under-14 championship, respectively. 

At Adidas Next Generation Tournament Munich in January 2020, Spagnolo averaged 9.5 points, 4.3 rebounds, and 3.3 assists per game, helping Real Madrid's under-18 team win the title.

Professional career

Stella Azzurra (2017–2018) 
At 13 years of age, Spagnolo moved to Rome to join Stella Azzurra. He made his Serie B debut at age 14, becoming the youngest Italian to play at the senior level.

Real Madrid (2018–2021) 
On 2 May 2018, he moved to Real Madrid in Spain, where he became the first Italian to join the club's youth academy.

On 8 March 2020, Spagnolo made his senior debut for Real Madrid, playing 36 seconds in a Liga ACB loss to Zaragoza.

Vanoli Cremona (2021–2022) 
In 2021–22 season Spagnolo was transferred on loan to Vanoli Cremona in the Italian Serie A.

Aquila Basket Trento (2022–present) 
On 28 July 2022, Spagnolo signed on loan with Aquila Basket Trento.

NBA draft rights 
Spagnolo was drafted with the 50th overall pick in the 2022 NBA draft by the Minnesota Timberwolves.

Career statistics

Domestic leagues

|-
| style="text-align:left;"| 2017–18
| style="text-align:left;"| Roma
| 14 || 0 || 6.9 || 2.5 || .430 || .310 || .840 || 1.6 || .4 || .2 || .0 || .6 
|-
| style="text-align:left;"| 2019–20
| style="text-align:left;"| Madrid B
| 17 || 17 || 28.8 || 16.0 || .552 || .357 || .855 || 4.7 || 3.0 || .9 || .2 || 1.5 
|-
| style="text-align:left;"| 2020–21
| style="text-align:left;"| Madrid B
| 10 || 10 || 27.2 || 14.3 || .455 || .375 || .700 || 5.4 || 2.6 || 1.1 || .1 || 2.1 
|-
| style="text-align:left;"| 2021–22
| style="text-align:left;"| Cremona
| 16 || 16 || 25.7 || 12.1 || .514 || .450 || .789 || 3.4 || 2.6 || .6 || .0 || 2.3

National team career
Spagnolo averaged 16.3 points, 6.7 rebounds, three steals and 2.6 assists per game for Italy at the 2019 FIBA U16 European Championship in Udine. He was named to the All-Star Five after helping his team earn the bronze medal. On 20 February 2020, at age 17, Spagnolo made his senior debut for Italy, scoring three points in a win over Russia at the EuroBasket qualification stage. He became the third-youngest player to play for Italy's senior team.

References

External links
Matteo Spagnolo International Stats at Basketball-Reference.com

2003 births
Living people
Aquila Basket Trento players
Italian expatriate basketball people in Spain
Italian men's basketball players
Liga ACB players
Minnesota Timberwolves draft picks
People from Brindisi
Real Madrid Baloncesto players
Shooting guards
Sportspeople from the Province of Brindisi
Vanoli Cremona players